Struszyński may refer to:

Marceli Struszyński (1880–1959), Polish chemist
Wacław Struszyński (1904–1980), Polish electronic engineer